Kirchsahr is a municipality in the district of Ahrweiler, in Rhineland-Palatinate, Germany.

Geography
Kirchsahr consists of the districts Kirchsahr, Binzenbach, Burgsahr, Hürnig and Winnen. It lies near the state border of Rhineland-Palatinate and North Rhine-Westphalia.

References

Ahrweiler (district)